Hoskins is an unincorporated community in Benton County, Oregon, United States.  Hoskins lies west of Oregon Route 223's intersection with Hoskins Road.  Hoskins is northwest of Wren and southwest of Kings Valley. The Luckiamute River flows through Hoskins. The community was named after Fort Hoskins (built in 1856), which was itself named after a soldier who died in the Mexican–American War, Lt. Charles Hoskins.

Hoskins was the headquarters of the Valley and Siletz Railroad.

Unincorporated communities in Benton County, Oregon
Unincorporated communities in Oregon